Skull: The Mask is a 2020 slasher film written and directed by Armando Fonseca and Kapel Furman. It stars Natallia Rodrigues as a detective investigating the ancient mask of Anhangá—a vassal of a pre-Columbian god—who is incarnated and embarks on a sacrificial killing spree. The film is an international co-production of Brazil and the United States.

Skull: The Mask premiered digitally as part of the Chattanooga Film Festival on 22 May 2020. The film is available for streaming on Shudder as of 27 May 2021.

Plot

Cast
 Natallia Rodrigues as Beatriz Obdias
 Wilton Andrade as Manco Ramirez
 Ricardo Gelli	as Padre Vasco Magno
  as Galvani Volta
  as Lilah
 Tristan Aronovich as Nobuto
 Ivo Müller as Tack Waelder
 Eduardo Semerjian as Herr Schädel
 Che Moais as Pajé Iratinga
 Rurik Jr. as Skull

Release
In 2018, Cinestate acquired the rights to distribute Skull: The Mask in the United States through the Fangoria label.

Skull: The Mask premiered digitally on 22 May 2020 as part of the 7th annual Chattanooga Film Festival. The festival took place online as a virtual event due to the COVID-19 pandemic.

The film was made available for streaming on Shudder on 27 May 2021.

Reception

Meagan Navarro of Bloody Disgusting called the film "a gloriously carnage-fueled horror movie nestled deep within a messy web of entangled plot threads. A lot of it doesn't work, but it's hard to be too upset about a film that brings an insane amount of gore and intriguing new monster mythology to the table." Screen Anarchys Andrew Mack praised the film's gore as "fantastic" and "top notch", though he noted: "It feels like two separate films were made then there was an attempt to edit them together and make a cohesive whole." Jacob Oller of Paste Magazine complimented the film's prop design but criticized its choreography and staging, writing that "Skull: The Mask just isn't shot in a way to fully appreciate the nastiness its creators so clearly enjoy." Nick Allen of Roger Ebert.com gave the film a score of one-and-a-half out of four stars, finding faults with its characters, editing, and sound mixing.

Gizmodo's Cheryl Eddy praised the film's special effects, and wrote that the perceived complexity of the film's plot "doesn't detract much from the movie's enjoyability." Drew Tinnin of Dread Central gave the film four-and-a-half out of five stars, calling it "an indie action slasher masterpiece." Both Eddy and Tinnin compared the film's antagonist to Jason Voorhees of the Friday of the 13th franchise, with Tinnin writing that "Brazil may have found their version of Kane Hodder in pro-wrestler Rurik Jr." The Guardians Phil Hoad gave the film three out of five stars, calling it a "silly, uneven but strangely appealing slasher film that leaves no heart unripped from human thorax." Martin Unsworth of Starburst Magazine rated Skull: The Mask four out of four, commending its action scenes, pacing, performances, and special effects. Hope Madden of UK Film Review called it a "throwback exploitation" and said the "film’s opening is its strongest segment, a grainy video portrayal of a 1944 political bloodbath with the goal of enacting an ancient pre-Columbian ritual."

References

External links
 
 

2020 horror films
2020 films
2020s slasher films
Brazilian horror films
American slasher films
Brazilian mythology in popular culture
Films set in São Paulo
2020s Portuguese-language films
2020s American films